In the United States, a white Hispanic or Latino is an individual who is of full or partial Hispanic or Latino descent, the largest group being white Mexican Americans. Although not differentiated in the U.S. Census definition, White Latino Americans may also be defined to include only those who identify as white and either originate from or have descent from countries in Latin America that speak Romance languages such as Brazil, Haiti, and French Guiana.

Based on the definitions created by the Office of Management and Budget and the US Census Bureau, the concepts of race and ethnicity are mutually independent. For the Census Bureau, ethnicity distinguishes between those who report ancestral origins in Spain or Latin America (Hispanic and Latino Americans), and those who do not (non-Hispanic Americans). From 1850 to 1920, Mexicans in the United States were generally classified as white by the U.S. Census. In 1930, "Mexican" was officially added as a racial category on the United States Census but was soon after removed due to political pressure from the Mexican consul general in New York, the Mexican ambassador in Washington, the Mexican government itself, Mexican Americans, and the League of United Latin American Citizens (LULAC) who protested the exclusion from whiteness. In 1970, a 5 percent sample of the Census was asked if their “origin or descent” was Mexican, Puerto Rican, Cuban, Central or South American, or Other Spanish. In 1980, the full population was asked about "Spanish/Hispanic origin or descent" identifying three nationalities (“Mexican, Mexican-American, Chicano”). Thereafter "Latino" was classified solely as an ethnicity separate from race. In 2000, the US Census Bureau allowed persons to check multiple race identifiers.

As of 2020, 62 million or 18.7% of residents of the United States of America identified as Hispanic or Latino of which 12.5 million or 20.3% self-identified as white alone down from the 2019 American Community Survey when 38.3 million, or 65.5% of Latinos self-identified as white.

History 
Some white Latinos in the United States of America today are descended from original Spanish colonists who settled the so-called "internal provinces" and Louisiana of New Spain. As the United States expanded westward, it annexed lands with a long-established population of Spanish-speaking settlers, who were overwhelmingly or exclusively of white Spanish ancestry (cf. White Mexican). This group became known as Hispanos. Prior to incorporation into the United States of America (and briefly, into Independent Texas), Hispanos had enjoyed a privileged status in the society of New Spain and later in post-colonial Mexico.

Racial identity 
Concepts of multiracial identity have existed in Latin America since the colonial era, originating in a Spanish caste system. During the 20th century, the concept of mestizaje, or 'blending', was adopted as a national identity by a number of Latin American countries in order to reduce racial conflict.

A 2014 Pew Research Center survey found that one-third of US Latinos identify as "mestizo", "mulatto", or another multiracial identity. Such identities often conflict with standard racial classifications in the United States: among Latino American adults surveyed by Pew Research who identified as multiracial, about 40% reported their race as "white" on standard race question as used on the US Census; 13% reported belonging to more than one race or "mixed race"; while about 20% chose "Latino" as their race.

Demographics 

As of 2019, 58.5 million or 18% of Americans identified themselves ethnically as Hispanic or Latino. Of those, 38.3 million, or 65.5% (11.8% of the total US population), also self-identified as white.

In the 2000 census, the responses that contained a race specified by the Office of Management and Budget and a race not specified by OMB, were reclassified to match the races that OMB had considered. In this way, 44.24% of the hispanic population that had marked as white and another race not specified by the OMB was recategorized as only white.

Hispanics and Latinos who are native-born and those who are immigrant identify as white in nearly identical percentages: 53.9 and 53.7, respectively, per figures from 2007. The overall Hispanic or Latino ratio was 53.8%.

In 2017, the Pew Research Center reported that high intermarriage rates and declining Latin American immigration has led to 11% of US adults with Hispanic ancestry (5.0 million people) to no longer identify as Hispanic. First generation immigrants from Spain & Latin America identify as Hispanic at very high rates (97%) which reduces in each succeeding generation, second generation (92%), third generation (77%), and fourth generation (50%).

White Hispanics are widespread, with Florida and Texas being 2 states with some of the highest percentages of Hispanics self identifying as white. New Mexico has the highest percentage of the overall population identifying as white Hispanic with 37.4%.

Population by national origin 

Some Hispanic or Latino American groups that have white majorities or pluralities originate in countries that do not. For example, Mexico's white only population is 9% to 17%, while Mexico is majoritarily mestizo, meaning that they have mixed European and Native American ancestry, while 52.8% of Mexican Americans are white, or identify themselves as white in the Census (See the table). The differences in racial perceptions that exist in both countries are considered: The concept of race in Mexico is subtle not only including physical clues such as skin color but also cultural dispositions, morality, economic, and intellectual status. It is not static or well defined but rather is defined and redefined by the situation. This makes racial distinctions different from those in other countries such as the United States.

Other important differences lay in the criteria and formats used for the censuses in each country: In Mexico, the only ethnic census including categories other than Amerindian (dated back to 1921) performed by the government offered the following options in the questionnaire:
 Full European heritage
 Mixed Indigenous and European heritage (the term "mestizo" itself was never used by the government)
 Full Indigenous
 Foreigners without racial distinction
 Other race
The census had the particularity that, unlike racial/ethnic census in other countries, it was focused in the perception of cultural heritage rather than in a racial perception, leading to a good number of white people to identify with "Mixed heritage" due cultural influence. On the other hand, while only 2.9% of the population of the United States identifies as mixed race there is evidence that an accounting by genetic ancestry would produce a higher number, but historical and cultural reasons, including slavery creating a racial caste and the European-American suppression of Native Americans, often led people to identify or be classified by only one ethnicity, generally that of the culture they were raised in. While many Americans may be biologically multiracial, they often do not know it or do not identify so culturally.

Representation in the media 
Judith Ortiz Cofer noted that appellation varies according to geographical location, observing that in Puerto Rico she was considered white, but in the United States she was considered a "brown person."

Since the early days of the movie industry in the United States of America, when white Hispanic actors are given roles, they are frequently cast in non-Hispanic white roles. Hispanic and Latino Americans began to appear in the American movie industry in the 1910s, and the leading players among them "were generally light skinned and Caucasian". Hispanics of pure European ancestry to be perceived as “Hispanic” are often or always stereotyped as having a typical Mediterranean/Southern European appearance - olive skin, dark hair, and dark eyes; even Hispanics of Middle Eastern descent are perceived “Hispanic” by their Mediterranean features.

Myrtle Gonzalez was one such American actress in the silent film era; she starred in at least 78 motion pictures from 1913 to 1917. Anita Page was an American actress of Spanish descent who reached stardom in 1928, during the last years of the silent film. Page was referred to as "a blond, blue-eyed Latin". Hilary Swank an American actress and film producer recipient of numerous awards, including two Academy Awards and two Golden Globe Awards. Her maternal grandmother, Frances Martha Clough (née Dominguez), was born in El Centro, California, and was of Mexican descent.

Telenovelas (soap operas) have been criticized for not fully reflecting the racial diversity of Hispanic and Latino Americans, and for underrepresenting non-white Hispanic, Latino Americans, and non-white Latin Americans, in favor of those that are of lighter complexion, blonde-haired and blue/green-eyed rather than the typical white Latin Americans & white Hispanic and Latino Americans of Mediterranean appearance. For example, in the 2005 US Hispanic telenovela Olvidarte Jamas, white, blond, and blue-eyed Venezuelan American actress Sonya Smith portrayed Luisa Dominguez who is a poor mestiza woman; the actress had to wear a black wig. Sonya Smith, however, was the first Hispanic actor to portray a Hispanic without stereotypical perception (portrayed as blond and blue-eyed Hispanic, not a Hispanic mestiza nor mulatta nor Mediterranean-looking Hispanic) in a Hollywood film Hunted by Night, an English-language movie with an all-Hispanic cast.

White Hispanic/white Latino literature originating from the San Joaquin Valley revolves around the lives and stories of farmworkers. Meanwhile, the autobiographies of white stateside Puerto Ricans and the poetry of the Nuyorican Movement are most often about their socioeconomic concerns.

Marriage trends 
A total of 27% of Hispanics marry outside their ethnicity. Non-Hispanic white/Hispanic intermarriage is the most common intermarriage in the United States representing 42% of interethnic marriages compared to white/black at 11%. Intermarriage rates between whites and Hispanics do not differ significantly among the genders (with Hispanic females slightly more likely to marry whites).

Genetics 
Genetic research has found that the average non-European admixture is present in both white-Hispanics and non-Hispanic whites with different degrees according to different areas of the United States. Average European admixture among self-identified white Hispanic Americans is 73% (the average for Hispanic Americans regardless of race is 65.1%), contrasting to that of non-Hispanic European Americans, whose European ancestry totals 98.6% on average. "Average admixture," however, can be a misleading measure, as it conflates vastly different population groups and ignores marked differences within individual Latino groups. Each Latin American country has a unique demographic history. Mexican Americans and Central Americans may frequently be racially mestizo, for instance, but Mexico has the second largest white population in Latin America, after Brazil. Many other Latin American countries with higher proportions of white Latin Americans are Argentina, Uruguay and Colombia. The genetic profile of American Latinos varies from group to group and is a result of unique immigration histories. For instance, the Cuban exiles "fleeing the Castro regime in the 1960s and ’70s were almost entirely white, educated and middle or upper class."

Employment 
Farmworkers in the country are disproportionately white Hispanic/white Latino. This is especially true in some areas, for example Southern Arizona. Many are producers, in other words they are farm operators. White Hispanics/white Latinos are a larger part of the Southern Arizona population than in the rest of the country, and are a large part of the area's agricultural workforce.

See also 

 European Americans
 White Americans
 Non-Hispanic whites
 Spanish Americans
 Hispanos
 Neomexicano
 Tejano
 Stereotypes of Hispanic Americans
 List of Hispanic Americans
 Black Hispanic Americans
 Asian Hispanic Americans

References 

 
Hispanic and Latino American
European-American society
White Americans
Ethnic groups in the United States